Ammon Ashford Hennacy (1893–1970) was an American Christian pacifist, anarchist, social activist, member of the Catholic Worker Movement, and Wobbly. He established the Joe Hill House of Hospitality in Salt Lake City, Utah, and practiced tax resistance.

Biography
Hennacy was born in Negley, Ohio, to Quaker parents, Benjamin Frankin Hennacy and Eliza Eunice Fitz Randolph, and grew up as a Baptist. He studied at three different institutions, (a year at each one): Hiram College in Ohio in 1913, University of Wisconsin–Madison in 1914, and The Ohio State University in 1915. 

During this time, Hennacy was a card-carrying member of the Socialist Party of America and in his words "took military drills in order to learn how to kill capitalists." He was also the secretary of Hiram College's Intercollegiate Socialist Society. 

At the outbreak of World War I, Hennacy was imprisoned for two years in Atlanta, Georgia, for resisting conscription. While in prison the only book he was allowed was the Bible. This inspired him to radically depart from his earlier beliefs; he became a Christian pacifist and a Christian anarchist. He led a hunger strike and was punished with eight months in solitary confinement.  

Hennacy believed that adherence to Christianity required being a pacifist and, because governments constantly threaten or use force to resolve conflicts, this meant being an anarchist.

In 1919, Hennacy married his first wife, Selma Melms, under common law. He later described her as the "daughter of the Socialist sheriff of Milwaukee, leader of the Yipsels, as the young Socialists were called, and secretary to the President of the State Federation of Labor."  

In May 1920, Hennacy graduated from the socialist Rand School of Social Science.
In 1921, Hennacy and Melms hiked around the United States passing through all 48 of the contiguous states. He settled down in 1925, buying a farm and raising his two children. In 1931, he began social work in Milwaukee and organised one of the first social worker unions. 

He refused to use force or self-defense even when threatened during his work, preferring instead to use nonresistance. During this time, he also refused to sign up for the draft for World War II and declared that he would not pay taxes. He also reduced his tax liability by taking up a lifestyle of simple living. Between 1942 and 1953, Hennacy worked as a migrant farm labourer in the southwest United States.

In 1952, he was baptized as a Roman Catholic by Father Marion Casey at St. Anastasia Church with Dorothy Day as his godmother. Hennacy moved to New York City in 1953, and became the associate editor of the Catholic Worker newspaper.  Hennacy engaged in many picketing protests while in New York.  At that time, he wrote a critical review of Witness, memoir of Whittaker Chambers, and later wrote more about his dislike of Chambers, whose wife Esther Shemitz his first wife Selma and he had known through the Rand School of Social Science. He illegally refused to participate in New York City's annual air raid drills, and he picketed against the Atomic Energy Commission's war preparations in Las Vegas, Cape Kennedy, Washington, D.C., and Omaha. In 1958, Hennacy fasted for 40 days in protest of nuclear weapons testing.  

In 1961, Hennacy moved to Utah and organised the Joe Hill House of Hospitality in Salt Lake City. While in Utah, Hennacy fasted and picketed in protest of the death penalty and the use of taxes in war. Following a divorce from Selma in 1964, Hennacy married his second wife, Joan Thomas, in 1965. In the same year he left the Roman Catholic Church, though he continued to call himself a "non-church Christian". He was a member of the Industrial Workers of the World (Wobbly).

He wrote about his reasons for leaving and his thoughts on Catholicism, which included his belief that "Paul spoiled the message of Christ" (see Jesusism). This essay and others were published as The Book of Ammon in 1965, which has been praised for its "diamonds of insight and wisdom" but criticised for its rambling style.

In 1968, Hennacy closed the "Joe Hill House of Hospitality" and turned his attention to further protest and writing. His second and last book, The One-Man Revolution in America, was published in 1970 and consists of seventeen chapters with each one devoted to an American radical. These included Thomas Paine, William Lloyd Garrison, John Woolman, Dorothy Day, Eugene Debs, Malcolm X, Mother Jones, Clarence Darrow and Albert Parsons.

Ammon Hennacy died from a heart attack on January 14, 1970. His funeral was held at Our Lady of Lourdes Catholic Church in Salt Lake City. In accordance with his wishes, his body was cremated and the ashes scattered over the graves of the Haymarket anarchists in Waldheim Cemetery in Chicago.

Political and ethical beliefs
Ammon Hennacy was a pacifist, a Christian anarchist, and an advocate of anarchism and nonresistance.  He was extremely critical of what he described as the "institutional church" and state capitalism.

He did not drink or smoke and was a vegetarian. Much of his activism was anti-war, anti-nuclear proliferation, and against the death penalty.

Hennacy never paid federal income taxes because they pay for the military and war. He lived a life of voluntary simplicity and believed in what he called his "One-Man Revolution" against violence, sin, and coercion. He also refused to accept the legitimacy of the judiciary. Dorothy Day said "Tolstoi and Gandhi, and Jesus became his teachers".

Influence on folk
When Ani DiFranco gathered stories by Utah Phillips to make the 1996 album The Past Didn't Go Anywhere, she included his story about Hennacy, under the title "Anarchy". Hennacy helped shape Phillips, who often told this story.

Film
 Page, Marcus P. Blaise (2005)

Bibliography
 The Autobiography of a Catholic Anarchist (1954) Catholic Worker Books, New York. Reprinted by Literary Licensing, Whitefish, 2011. . Complete e-text, free eBook.
 The Book of Ammon (1965) Ammon Hennacy Publications, Salt Lake City (lengthened version of The Autobiography of a Catholic Anarchist, includes the years 1955 to 1964). Reprinted by Wipf and Stock, Eugene, 2010. . Complete e-text, free eBook.
 The One-Man Revolution in America (1970) Ammon Hennacy Publications, Salt Lake City. Reprinted by Wipf and Stock, Eugene, 2012. .

See also
 Christian vegetarianism
 List of peace activists

References

Further reading
 Thomas, Joan (1993) The Years of Grief and Laughter: A "Biography" of Ammon Hennacy. Baltimore, MD, Fortkamp Publishing Co. Reprinted by Wipf and Stock, Eugene, 2012. .

External links

 Ammon Hennacy – A One-Person Revolution in America
 The Ammon Hennacy Papers
 Ammon Hennacy: an anecdotal sketch by Don Dedera
 Ammon Hennacy Page (with chronology, bibliography, links) - Anarchist Encyclopedia
 The authorized biographical movie – by Lovarchy-Shalom Productions
 A review of Hennacy's autobiography: The Book of Ammon
 The Autobiography of a Catholic Anarchist by Ammon Hennacy
 "Remembering Ammon Hennacy" by James F. Holwell

1893 births
1970 deaths
American anarchists
American anti-capitalists
American anti-war activists
American autobiographers
American Christian pacifists
American Christian socialists
American conscientious objectors
American social activists
American tax resisters
Anarcho-pacifists
Anti-consumerists
Catholic Workers
Catholicism and far-left politics
Christian anarchists
Hiram College alumni
Industrial Workers of the World members
Non-interventionism
Nonviolence advocates
Ohio State University alumni
People from Columbiana County, Ohio
Simple living advocates
Socialism in the United States
University of Wisconsin–Madison alumni
War Resisters League activists